So What may refer to:

Law
Demurrer, colloquially called a "So what?" pleading

Music

Albums 
 So What (Anti-Nowhere League album) or the 1981 title song (see below), 2000
 So What?: Early Demos and Live Abuse, by Anti-Nowhere League, 2006
 So What (George Russell album), 1987
 So What (Jerry Garcia and David Grisman album), 1998
 So What (Joe Walsh album), 1974
 So What? (Ron Carter album), 1999
 So What? (While She Sleeps album) or the title song, 2019
 So What, an EP by Le Shok, 1998

Songs
 "So What" (Miles Davis composition), 1959
 "So What", by Johnny Kidd & the Pirates, 1961
 "So What", by Bill Black, 1962
 "So What", by Ray Rush, 1962
 "So What", by Crass from The Feeding of the 5000, 1978
 "So What", by the Cure from Three Imaginary Boys, 1979
 "So What", by Liverpool Express, 1983
 "So What", by Ministry from The Mind Is a Terrible Thing to Taste, 1989
 "So What", by Gilbert O'Sullivan, 1990
 "So What?" (Anti-Nowhere League song), 1981; covered by Metallica, 1993
 "So What", by John Cale from Walking on Locusts, 1996
 "So What!", by Jane's Addiction from Kettle Whistle, 1997
 "So What", by Ken Carson from Project X, 2021
 "So What!!", by the Lyrics, included on Nuggets: Original Artyfacts from the First Psychedelic Era, 1965–1968, 1998 reissue
 "So What", a song from the Bratz Rock Angelz soundtrack, 2005
 "So What" (Field Mob song), 2006
 "So What" (Pink song), 2008
 "So What?", by Far East Movement from Free Wired, 2010
 "So What", by Three Days Grace from Human, 2015
 "So What", by Zebrahead from Walk the Plank, 2015
 "So What" (Xu Weizhou song), 2017
 "So, What?", by Band-Maid from Just Bring It, 2017
 "So What", by BTS from Love Yourself: Tear, 2018
 "So What" (Loona song), 2020
 "So What", by Carl Carlton
 "So What", by Grazina